HD 193307 (HR 7766; Gliese 9691) is a star in the southern constellation Telescopium. With an apparent magnitude of 6.26, it is barely visible to the naked eye under ideal conditions. The star is located about 102 light years away based on parallax, but is drifting away with a radial velocity of 18.31 km/s.

Properties
HD 193307 has 1.15 times the Sun's mass, and 1.45 times the Sun's radius. It radiates at a luminosity twice the latter from its photosphere at an effective temperature of 6,059 K, which gives it the yellow-white hue of an F-type main-sequence star. HD 193307 has an age of about 7 billion years, nearly twice the Sun's age. It is metal-deficient, with an iron abundance 46% that of the Sun. HD 193307 has a common proper motion M2.5 companion 21.3" away, which makes it a binary star.

References

F-type main-sequence stars
Gliese and GJ objects
7766
100412
193307
Durchmusterung objects
Double stars
M-type main-sequence stars
Telescopium (constellation)